James Quinton may refer to:

 James Quinton (cricketer) (1874–1922), English cricketer 
 James Quinton (politician) (1821–1874), farmer, building contractor and political figure in New Brunswick
 James Wallace Quinton (1834–1891), British colonial administrator